Mervyn Bennett (born 7 September 1944) is an Australian equestrian. He won a bronze medal in team eventing at the 1976 Summer Olympics in Montreal, Quebec, Canada.

References

External links
 

Australian male equestrians
Olympic equestrians of Australia
Olympic bronze medalists for Australia
Equestrians at the 1976 Summer Olympics
Equestrians at the 1984 Summer Olympics
Olympic medalists in equestrian
Medalists at the 1976 Summer Olympics
1944 births
Living people
People from Nowra
Sportsmen from New South Wales
20th-century Australian people